Trio's Childcare Challenge is a South Korean reality show program on KBS 2 starring Seo Jang-hoon, Kim Gu-ra, Kim Min-jong and Hwang Chi-yeul. The show airs on KBS 2 starting from July 6, 2019. It is distributed and syndicated by KBS every Saturday at 22:45 (KST). The program also airs on KBS World with English subtitles.

Casts

Synopsis 
Every episode, the hosts will be taking care of different children for the children's busy parents.

Ratings 
 Ratings listed below are the individual corner ratings of Trio's Childcare Challenge. (Note: Individual corner ratings do not include commercial time, which regular ratings include.)

References

External links 
 Official website
 

Korean Broadcasting System
South Korean television shows
Korean-language television shows
2019 South Korean television series debuts
South Korean reality television series
2019 South Korean television series endings